Victor James Osimhen (born 29 December 1998) is a Nigerian professional footballer who plays as a striker for  club Napoli and the Nigeria national team. Considered as one of the best strikers in the world, he is known for his speed, clinical finishing and athleticism.

Born in Nigeria, Osimhen began his senior career in Germany at VfL Wolfsburg in 2017. Following a season and a half at the club, he moved to Belgian side Charleroi on loan in 2018–19, before moving to France at Lille. In 2020, Osimhen transferred to Serie A club Napoli for a club-record fee of €70 million. He won the Serie A Best Young Player award in the 2021–22 season.

Osimhen won the Golden Boot award at the 2015 FIFA U-17 World Cup, which Nigeria won. He made his senior international debut in June 2017 and played at the 2019 Africa Cup of Nations. He is currently the ninth all-time highest goalscorer of the Nigeria national team.

Early life
Osimhen was born in Lagos (he grew up in Olusosun to parents from Edo State). Growing up, his footballing idol was Didier Drogba.

Club career
Osimhen started his career at the Ultimate Strikers Academy, based in Lagos, Nigeria. In January 2016, after being noticed for his performances at the 2015 FIFA U-17 World Cup, Osimhen committed to a pre-contract with VfL Wolfsburg, stipulating that he would officially join the club in January 2017.

VfL Wolfsburg
On 5 January 2017, Osimhen officially signed a three-and-a-half-year deal with the club, lasting until June 2020. Out with an injury upon his arrival, he made his Bundesliga debut for Wolfsburg on 13 May, coming on as a substitute in the 59th minute in a 1–1 draw against Borussia Mönchengladbach. Osimhen also came on the following week in a pivotal relegation tie against Hamburger SV, on what was the final match day of the 2016–17 season. He replaced defender Sebastian Jung with the score tied 1–1, and Hamburg scored a late winner to pass Wolfsburg in the table, sending Wolfsburg to a relegation playoff with Eintracht Braunschweig. Osimhen was in the squad for both matches, receiving a cameo at the end of the second leg with Wolfsburg's participation in the next Bundesliga confirmed, as they won 2–0 on aggregate.

Osimhen was named in 12 of the 17 matchday squads in the first half of the 2017–18 season, appearing in 5 games. He earned his full Bundesliga debut on 28 January 2018 against Hannover, playing the full 90 minutes in their 1–0 win. Osimhen made two more starts the rest of the campaign, playing the full match against Werder Bremen on 11 February and being replaced at the half by Daniel Didavi against Hertha Berlin on 31 March. Wolfsburg were again in the relegation playoff, but Osimhen missed out through injury. He also appeared in one game of Wolfsburg's DFB Pokal campaign, replacing midfielder Josuha Guilavogui for the last ten minutes of their 1–0 defeat to Schalke in the quarter-final. Osimhen underwent shoulder surgery on 2 May, ending his season with 12 appearances in the Bundesliga to his name.

Charleroi
Osimhen had summer trials with Belgian clubs Zulte Waregem and Club Brugge, who were the reigning champions. However, a summer bout with malaria had affected his physical condition, and neither club decided to take him on loan.
On 22 August 2018, Osimhen joined Belgian club Charleroi on a season-long loan deal, having failed to score in any of his 16 appearances with Wolfsburg. He replaced the departed Kaveh Rezaei, who was sold to Club Brugge after scoring 3 goals in the first three games of the season. Osimhen made his debut on 1 September against Excel Mouscron, entering as a late substitute for Jérémy Perbet. Osimhen made his full debut on 22 September, scoring his first goal as a professional with a backheel against Waasland-Beveren. Waasland-Beveren would equalise against 10-man Charleroi, and Perbet would later get sent off in the game as well, aiding manager Felice Mazzu's selection up top. Osimhen would start with Adama Niane for the next four games, scoring the club's only goal in losses to Cercle Brugge and Gent. He also scored twice in the last five minutes in a 3–2 win over Zulte Waregem on 21 October, after Hamdi Harbaoui had given Waregem a 2–1 lead with a second half brace. Osimhen was not dropped from the side until 25 November, when he scored a goal off the bench in the club's 4–2 win over Lokeren. After the game, Osimhen told BBC Sport that he had "found his happiness again". Osimhen finished the first half with 8 goals in 16 games, second only to Cristian Benavente in the team.

After a successful spell with the Belgian side, playing 36 games and scoring 20 goals, Charleroi activated their option to acquire Osimhen following his satisfactory performances while on loan.

Lille

In July 2019, Osimhen signed for Lille. On 11 August 2019, he made his Ligue 1 debut for the club, scoring a brace in a 2–1 win against Nantes.

Osimhen was named the Ligue 1 Player of the Month for September 2019, having scored two goals and assisted two more in Lille's five league matches. On 2 June 2020, he was awarded Lille's Player of the Season, having secured the highest number of votes from fans.

Osimhen scored his first goal in the UEFA Champions League on 2 October 2019, coming in a 1–2 home defeat to English side Chelsea. The Nigerian finished the season as Lille's top scorer, with 13 goals in 25 Ligue 1 matches, and 18 goals across all competitions. His strong goalscoring performances saw Osimhen tipped by many to be in running for the African Footballer of the Year award in the near future.

Napoli

2020–21 season
On 31 July 2020, Serie A club Napoli announced the signing of Osimhen, for a club-record fee of €70 million potentially rising to €80 million with add-ons, making him the most expensive African transfer to date. On 17 October, Osimhen scored his first goal for Napoli in a 4–1 win against Atalanta. Upon scoring, he held up a shirt calling for the ending of the ongoing police brutality in his home country of Nigeria.

On 13 November, during an Africa Cup of Nations qualifying game played whilst on international break with Nigeria, Osimhen was stretchered off injured. This was then diagnosed as a shoulder injury that would keep Osimhen away from the playing field for two months. 

While recovering from the injury, Osimhen was authorized by his club to spend time in his home country, where he got a chance to celebrate his birthday. It was during these birthday celebrations that it is believed Osimhen contracted the COVID-19 virus, as he tested positive upon returning to Naples. This positive test, together with his shoulder injury, kept Osimhen away from action until his return to the side on 29 January 2021, when he was subbed on for around twenty minutes of Napoli's Coppa Italia win against Spezia.

2021–22 season
On 16 September 2021, Osimhen scored a brace in a 2–2 away draw against Leicester City in the Europa League group stage. By the end of the season, he scored 14 goals in Serie A and 18 in all competitions.

2022–23 season
On 12 October 2022, Osimhen scored his first Champions League goal with Napoli in a 4–2 win over Ajax, which secured their qualification to the knockout phase. On 29 October, he scored his first Serie A hat-trick in a 4–0 win over Sassuolo. On 11 November, he scored a goal and assisted another to help Napoli win 2–1 at Atalanta, becoming Nigeria's highest goal scorer in the Italian Serie with 32 goals, and surpassing Simy's record of 31.

On 13 January 2023, Osimhen scored two and assisted another as Napoli beat Juventus 5–1. On 17 February 2023, he scored his 100th career goal to help Napoli win 2–0 at Sassuolo. He also became the first ever player in the history of Napoli in the three-point era to score in seven league games in a row. In the Champions League round of 16, Osimhen scored three goals over two legs for Napoli against Eintracht Frankfurt, which ended in a 5–0 win on aggregate and a first-time qualification to the quarter-finals.

International career
Osimhen was a member of the Nigeria under-17 team that won the 2015 FIFA U-17 World Cup in Chile. He scored 10 goals in seven games at the tournament and won the Golden Boot and Silver Ball awards. His performances also earned him the CAF Youth Player of the Year award in 2015.

Osimhen made his senior debut for Nigeria in a 2–0 defeat against South Africa on 10 June 2017. He missed out on Nigeria's 2018 FIFA World Cup campaign after his inconsistent season at Wolfsburg. Following a successful start to his loan spell at Charleroi, he was recalled by Gernot Rohr for the November 2018 international break, starting their friendly win over Uganda.

In March 2019, Osimhen was released from the Super Eagles squad to represent the Nigerian U23 side as they were two goals down against their Libyan opponent. He scored three goals in the return match against Libya in Asaba.

Osimhen was listed in coach Gernot Rohr's 25-man provisional list for 2019 Africa Cup of Nations tournament in Egypt and was further listed in the final list for the tournament. In the match for third place, he replaced the injured Odion Ighalo at half-time in the team's 1–0 victory over Tunisia. He played a total of 45 mins at the tournament.

The Super Eagles ended the 2021 AFCON qualifiers on a high, beating Lesotho 3–0. However, Osimhen missed the 2021 Africa Cup of Nations supposedly due to COVID‑19 as claimed by his club. This claim provoked a response from a sport lawyer in Nigeria who wrote to express his dismay to the alleged intention of Osimhen's club side, Napoli, to deprive Nigeria the services of their star striker. The Napoli owner, Aurelio De Laurentiis, angered many Africans, when he said he would no longer sign African players unless they agreed to sign a waiver to not participate in the AFCON.

Osimhen started the qualification for the 2023 AFCON qualifiers in sparkling form helping Nigeria win both of their first two matches. Osimhen netted a goal against Sierra Leone and another four goals in a 10–0 win against São Tomé and Príncipe.

Career statistics

Club

International

Scores and results list Nigeria's goal tally first, score column indicates score after each Osimhen goal.

Honours
Nigeria U17
FIFA U-17 World Cup: 2015

Nigeria
Africa Cup of Nations third place: 2019

Individual
African U-17 Championship Golden Boot: 2015
FIFA U-17 World Cup Golden Boot: 2015
FIFA U-17 World Cup Silver Ball: 2015
CAF Youth Player of the Year: 2015
UNFP Ligue 1 Player of the Month: September 2019
Prix Marc-Vivien Foé: 2020
Lille Player of the Season: 2019–20
Serie A Best Young Player: 2021–22
Serie A Player of the Month: March 2022, January 2023
Serie A Goal of the Month: January 2023
Globe Soccer Awards Emerging Player of the Year: 2022
Stampa Estera Italia Best Foreign Athlete of the Year: 2022

References

External links

Profile at the S.S.C. Napoli website
 
 
 

1998 births
Living people
Sportspeople from Lagos
Association football forwards
Nigerian footballers
Nigeria youth international footballers
Nigeria under-20 international footballers
Nigeria international footballers
Bundesliga players
Belgian Pro League players
Ligue 1 players
Serie A players
VfL Wolfsburg players
R. Charleroi S.C. players
Lille OSC players
S.S.C. Napoli players
Expatriate footballers in Germany
Expatriate footballers in Belgium
Expatriate footballers in France
Expatriate footballers in Italy
Nigerian expatriate footballers
Nigerian expatriate sportspeople in Germany
Nigerian expatriate sportspeople in Belgium
Nigerian expatriate sportspeople in France
Nigerian expatriate sportspeople in Italy
2019 Africa Cup of Nations players
2015 Africa U-23 Cup of Nations players